Dent Mowrey (1888–1960) was an American composer, musician and music teacher who lived in Oregon from 1916 until his death in 1960.

Early life
His birthplace is uncertain, but he grew up in Ogden, Utah. His father was a housepainter and his mother a dressmaker. As a child, Mowrey visited Oregon with his mother and fell in love with the state. His musical talents led him to the prestigious Leipzig Conservatory in Germany. After graduation he studied composition with Claude Debussy and gave recitals in Paris, including one that was "the first time an American composer has been heard at the Sorbonne". Upon returning to the United States in 1916, Mowrey settled in Portland as a concert pianist, teacher, and composer.

Mowrey as teacher
In 1928 Mowrey convinced the owner of the new Pacific Building, then the tallest building in Portland, to build a piano studio on the rooftop. Students rode the elevator to the roof and took lessons in the glass-walled studio, playing alongside Mowrey on one of two rare 9-foot Chickering grand pianos. According to Dolores Hsu, a student in the early 1940s, the acoustics were spectacular, and the music floated out from the rooftop garden that few below knew existed.

An early and influential member of the Oregon Music Teachers Association, Mowrey created music that other teachers valued for developing their students' technique. At least a dozen of these works were published by G. Schirmer. Mowrey was also an early member of the Society of Oregon Composers and the Musicians Club of Portland.

Mowrey as composer
Mowrey composed for the piano, vocal ensembles, band, woodwind and string ensembles, and orchestra. The Portland Symphony Society, now known as the Oregon Symphony, premiered several of his works starting with his orchestration of his solo piano work "The Gargoyles of Notre Dame" on the orchestra's first national radio broadcast in 1927.

While living abroad, he journeyed through the North African Sahara with a Beduoin caravan to research the native music there. His "Bedouin Melody" was performed by the Portland Symphony. His "Piano Concerto (Africa)", which he played with a number of West Coast symphonies, gave his impression of the contrasting civilizations of ancient and modern Africa.

A legacy recovered
Mowrey did not seek the limelight and tended to be unassuming and private. In the late 1950s, his home was broken into. He and his wife Eve were locked in a closet. When they were finally found, the experience left them in a reclusive state, and Mowrey's heart condition was worsened.

After Mowrey's death in 1960, a report was given to the Oregon Historical Society along with concert programs, recital announcements, and lists of his published and unpublished works. His musical compositions were donated to the Multnomah County Library in downtown Portland. Many of the pieces were not catalogued and sat in storage until 2009.

Allan Halbert, a conductor/music director in Oregon, was intrigued with the idea of reviving Mowrey's music. When asked about the collection, the library decided to designate it as rare book material. The works, mostly manuscripts in Mowrey's hand and written in pencil, were relocated to the John Wilson Special Collections room. As rare book material, they could not be checked out or photocopied, and the only option at the time was to photograph them. Halbert photographed nearly one thousand pages of unpublished and unrecorded works and then began the process of restoring the music to a playable condition. This included retracing the notes and other markings with a pencil, creating missing parts, and correcting discrepancies between the scores and parts. Under Halbert's direction, in June 2010 the Starlight Symphony of Tigard, Oregon, gave a concert including "The Gargoyles of Notre Dame". According to the director of the John Wilson Special Collections, scans can now be provided for the Mowrey materials upon request, with the intention of eventually digitizing these scores.

References

External links
 YouTube: Jon Moltmann conducting Mowrey's "Gavotte".

Musicians from Oregon
1888 births
1960 deaths